Brigitte Le Brethon (born 8 March 1951) is a French politician, and a member of The Republicans. She was born in Campeaux, Calvados, France.

She was the mayor of Caen from 2001 to 2008. She was Caen's first woman mayor and was defeated in March 2008 by Philippe Duron, a member of the Socialist Party.

She was elected on 16 June 2002, for the 12th legislature (2002–2007), in the First constituency of Calvados.

Political Office
14 March 1983 – 19 March 1989 : Deputy mayor of Caen.
18 March 1985 – 29 March 1992 : Vice-president of the General Council of Calvados.
20 March 1989 – 18 June 1995 : Deputy mayor of Caen.
30 March 1992 – 22 March 1998 : Vice-president of the general Council of Calvados.
19 March 1995 – 18 March 2001 : Deputy mayor of Caen.
6 March 1998 – 15 July 2002 : Vice-president of the regional Council of Lower Normandy.
16 June 2002 – 19 June 2007 : Member of the National Assembly in Calvados's 1st constituency.
24 March 2001 – 23 March 2008 : Mayor of Caen, France.

Sources
Official site at the National Assembly

1951 births
Living people
People from Souleuvre en Bocage
Politicians from Normandy
Union for a Popular Movement politicians
Deputies of the 12th National Assembly of the French Fifth Republic
Mayors of Caen
Women members of the National Assembly (France)
Women mayors of places in France
20th-century French women politicians
21st-century French women politicians
French schoolteachers
University of Caen Normandy alumni
Chevaliers of the Légion d'honneur
Knights of the Ordre national du Mérite